Thomas Butler, 6th Viscount Ikerrin (1683 – 7 March 1719) was an Irish nobleman.

He was born in Kilkenny, Ireland to James Butler, 3rd Viscount Ikerrin and Eleanor Redman, daughter of Colonel Daniel Redman, of Ballylinch, County Kilkenny and Abigail Otway. He was a descendant of John Butler of Clonamicklon. He was educated at Trinity College, Dublin. Thomas was a member of the clergy and Chaplain-General to the Army in Flanders. He married Margaret Hamilton, daughter and co-heiress of James Hamilton of Bangor, County Down  and Sophia Mordaunt, daughter of John Mordaunt, 1st Viscount Mordaunt and Elizabeth Carey. His elder brother Pierce Butler, 4th Viscount Ikerrin, a Brigadier general in the Army, died in 1711, leaving an infant son, James, who succeeded as 5th Viscount but died young, whereupon  Thomas succeeded to the title.

Children 
 James Butler, 7th Viscount Ikerrin (1714 – 20 October 1721), died at seven years of age
 Somerset Butler, 1st Earl of Carrick (6 September 1718 – 15 April 1774), also the 8th Viscount Ikerrin, married Lady Juliana Boyle and had issue.

See also
 Butler dynasty

References 

The Peerage Accessed March 31, 2008
Reilly, Emily Gorgiana Susanna Montgomery. Historical Anecdotes of the Families of the Boleynes, Careys, Mordaunts, Hamiltons and Jocelyns; Arr. As an Elucidation of the Genealogical Chart at Tollymore Park. (p. 71) Newry: J. Henderson, 1839. googlebooks Retrieved March 31, 2008

1683 births
1719 deaths
Thomas
Ordained peers
Viscounts in the Peerage of Ireland
People from County Kilkenny
Alumni of Trinity College Dublin